Panvel is a city and taluka in Raigad district of Maharashtra, India. It is highly populated due to its closeness to Mumbai. Panvel is also governed for development purpose by the body of Mumbai Metropolitan Region. Panvel Municipal Corporation is the first Municipal Corporation in Raigad and the 27th Municipal corporation of Maharashtra State.

Geography 
Panvel is one of the cities in the district of Raigad. It is also called the gate of Raigad because Panvel is the first city when entering in Raigad from west. It is also one of the most populous and developed cities in the district. Panvel is situated on the banks of the Gadhi river which flows and connects all the way to the Arabian Sea. It is also surrounded by hills on two sides.

Demographics 
Panvel has a mix population consisting of the Agri samaaj and Koli communities. Panvel is a medium-sized city but densely populated as it is strategically placed between Mumbai and Pune. The city is the headquarters of the Panvel sub-division of the Raigad district, which is the largest in the district as per number of villages (564).

Religion 

Hinduism is majority religion in Panvel city with 78.67% followers. Islam is second most popular religion in city of Panvel with approximately 10.85% following it, followed by Buddhism with 5.92% followers. In Panvel city, Christianity is followed by 2.13%, Jainism by 1.29%, Sikhism by 0.47%. Around 0.13% stated 'Other Religion', approximately 0.54% stated 'No Particular Religion'.

Climate
Weather is Sunny across the year. There is heavy rain during monsoon. May is the warmest month of the year. The temperature in May averages 34.3 °C. The lowest average temperatures in the year occur in January, when it is around 23.4 °C.
Temperatures hover around 40 °C during most days of summer during mid-March till May. Highest temperature recorded around 44–45 °C. 
Average annual temperature of Panvel is 27.0 °C.

History
Panvel (also known as Panwell by the British) is about 300 years old, developed around trade routes (both land and sea), during the Maratha rule and hence after by the Mughal rule, British and the Portuguese. Once upon a time, Panvel was famous for its rice market. Panvel Municipal Council (PMC) was established in the year 1852, and was the oldest municipal council of Maharashtra, before the formation of Panvel Municipal Corporation. Panvel Municipal Council's elections started in the year 1910. The first mayor of the PMC was Mr. Yusuf Noor Mohammed Master Kachchi for the years 1910–1916. The sesquicentennial anniversary (150th anniversary) of the PMC was celebrated in the year 2002. The city prospered and grew due to the influence of large scale trade by land and sea. This was characterised by the large palace-like homes that came up during the Peshwa period. It is also said that old name of this city was Paneli (Panelim in Konkani). There were historic cannons (during the time of Shivaji) situated on Panvel fort. On 1 October 2016, Panvel Municipal Corporation came into existence.

Location

Panvel lies approximately 40 kilometers east of Greater Mumbai, in Navi Mumbai, inside the Mumbai Metropolitan Region. It is surrounded by the mountains of Matheran to the east and south east and outer regions of Panvel i.e. villages of Dundhare, Maldunge are separated from the suburbs of Badlapur and Ambernath by hilly ranges of the Western Ghats. It lies adjacent to the Navi Mumbai International Airport forming its eastern boundary.

New Panvel

Most of the recent developments of Panvel are in New Panvel, as it's more of a planned city compared to Panvel city New Panvel is developed, administered, and maintained by CIDCO. Unlike Panvel city, New Panvel is strictly a node of Navi Mumbai. Though residents of New Panvel used to elect a representative in the Panvel Municipal Council, the Municipal Council does not control or manage any administrative or development activity in New Panvel.

Since October 2016, New Panvel was brought under administration of Panvel Municipal Corporation.

The development of New Panvel was initiated in 1970 to meet the housing requirements of employees working in the nearby industrial MIDC areas such as Taloja, Rasayani, Patalganga & Pen.

New Panvel is strategically located on the eastern side of the Mumbai-Bangalore National Highway (NH-4) and just west of the Mumbai-Pune Expressway. It is well connected to rest of India by roadways and railway.

New Panvel is divided in two parts – New Panvel East and New Panvel West (commonly known as Khanda Colony). They have 19 and 23 sectors respectively. It has separate railway station for Panvel and Khandeshwar.

New Panvel is just adjacent to the under construction Di.Ba Patil International airport which is located in Ulwe, a node in Navi Mumbai. It has a number of schools, colleges and hospitals, general stores and businesses. New Panvel is also a popular destination for the popular meal called Vada Pav. It also has India's one of the few virtual digital marketing agencies like DigiBeedoo Media.

Education
There are a large number of educational institutions in Panvel such as:
 Pillai College of Engineering (Autonomous), New Panvel
 Prudence International School (IGCSE and IB Board)

 Anjuman-I-Islam's Abdul Razzak Kalsekar Polytechnic, Panvel
 Anjuman-I-Islam's Kalsekar Technical Campus AIKTC, New Panvel
 Barns High School & College of Arts, Science & Commerce
 Changu Kana Thakur Arts, Commerce and Science College, New Panvel
 Changu Kana Thakur School
 D.A.V. Public School, New Panvel
 DD Vispute College
 Dr. Pillai's International School (IGCSE and IB Board)
 Government College of Education, Panvel
 Huda School – Panvel
 Industrial Training Institute Panvel
 K. A. Banthia High School and N.N.Paliwala Junior College, New Panvel
 Kendriya Vidyalaya ONGC Phase 1, Panvel (CBSE Board) 
 Konkan Education Society I.A.W English medium school (Indubai atmaram wajekar), Panvel
 Konkan Education society's K. V. Kanya High School (Kesahvaji Viraji), Panvel
 Konkan Education society's V. K. High School (Vithoba Khandappa), Panvel
 Maharashtra Education Society's Phadke Vidyalaya, New Panvel.
 Mahatma Education Society's Mahatma School of Academics & Sports and Mahatma International School, Khanda Colony
 Minority English School
 MPASC (Mahatma Phule Arts, Science & Commerce) College, Panvel
 New English School, New Panvel
 New Horizon Public School, Khanda Colony
 Shantiniketan Public School
 St George School,  Adhia Village
 St Marys School,  Sukhapur New Panvel
 St Xavier's English School, New Panvel 
 St. Johannes International School, Kolkhe, Panvel
 St. Josephs High School (SSC Board), Sector-7, Plot No-9 New Panvel (EAST)
 St. Joseph's Senior Secondary School (CBSE Board), Sector-11, New Panvel (WEST)
 St. Wilfred school
 Takale's Vidnyan Gurukul, Shirdhon, Panvel
 The Buddhist International School, New Panvel
 Yakub Baig High School – Panvel

Industries
Panvel in Navi Mumbai city, is surrounded by some major Maharashtra Industrial Development Corporation (MIDC) managed regions like Patalganga, Taloja, Nagothane, Roha, Khopoli, Bhiwandi. Some of the Indian industry majors like Larsen & Toubro Limited, Reliance, Hindustan Organic Chemicals Ltd.,ISRO's Propellant Complex., ONGC, IPCL are based around Panvel providing mass employment. The JNPT port is also located near Panvel. New SEZ declared by government are coming around Panvel.

Karnala fort

Karnala fort is a hill fort in Raigad district about 10 km from Panvel city. Currently it is a protected place lying within the Karnala Bird Sanctuary. It was a fort of strategic importance as it overlooked the Bor pass which connected the Konkan coast to the interior of Maharashtra (Vidharba) and was the main trade route between these areas. It lies between Pen and Panvel near Shirdhon village. The fort is 370 m above mean sea level.

Karnala bird sanctuary

At the bottom of the fort there is a famous Karnala Bird Sanctuary Karnala is 65 km away from Mumbai, 120 km away from Pune and 13 km away from Panvel. The sanctuary is around 25 m above mean sea level. Maharashtra government declared this 4.5 km region as the bird sanctuary in 1968–69. In the sanctuary one can find around 150 species of birds, such as the red vented bulbul, Indian grey hornbill, owl, paradise fly catcher.

Shirdhon

Vasudeo Balwant Phadke was born on 1845-11-04 in Shirdhon village of Panvel taluka based in Raigad district in Maharashtra state. The house and his belongings are preserved there.

Gadeshwar dam

During the monsoon, the Gadeshwar dam overflows. The place can be reached by entering New Panvel and via the Sukhapur-Nere road.  Panvel is also famous for watermelons, which can be found abundantly in and around the city and the old Mumbai–Pune highway.

Matheran

Matheran is a hill station and a municipal council in the Raigad district in the Indian state of Maharashtra.  It is a hill station in Karjat Tahsil and is also the smallest hill station in India. It is located on the Western Ghats range at an elevation of around 800 m (2,625 feet) above sea level. It is located around 90 km from Mumbai, and 120 km from Pune. Matheran's proximity to many metropolitan cities makes it a popular weekend getaway for urban residents. The Matheran Mountain can be easily viewed from certain areas in Panvel. One can trek matheran from Dhodani village in Panvel. The name Matheran means "forest on the forehead" (of the mountains).

Beth El Synagogue
Situated on M.G. Road, Panvel, it is the only synagogue in Panvel and is visited by both Jews and non-Jews. It is a tourist place and part of the Indian heritage.

Ballaleshwar Pali

Ballaleshwar (lit.: "Ballal's Lord") temple is one of the eight temples of Lord Ganesha. Among Ganesha temples, Ballaleshwar is the only incarnation of Ganesha that is known by his devotee's name. It is located in the village of Pali which is at a distance of 30 km from Karjat in the Raigad district. It is situated between fort Sarasgad and the river Amba. this is 11 km.from nagothane.

Varadvinayak, Mahad

Varadvinayak, also spelt as Varadavinayaka, is one of the Ashtavinayak temples of the Hindu deity Ganesha. It is located in Mahad village situated in Khalapur taluka near Karjat and Khopoli of Raigad district, Maharashtra, India. The temple was built (restored) by Peshwa General Ramji Mahadev Biwalkar in 1725AD.
There is an NMMT bus no. 58 from Belapur to Khopoli which halts at Mahad.

Transport
Panvel is an important junction point as many major highways meet and pass through the city. The Mumbai-Pune Expressway, Sion-Panvel Expressway, NH 4B and NH 66 start from here while NH 4 passes through Panvel. Roads of New Panvel are maintained by CIDCO while those in Panvel by PMC. New Panvel, being developed by CIDCO, has well planned and wide lane major roads and even the arterial roads are of two lanes leading to a single direction. Old Panvel has relatively less maintained roads which are congested due to lack of planning on part of the PMC.

Proposed Di.Ba International Airport
The Di.Ba International Airport or "NMIA" is planned to be built in the Panvel-Kopra area in the city of Navi Mumbai through public-private partnership (PPP) — with the private sector partner getting 74% equity and Airports Authority of India (AAI) & Maharashtra government, through CIDCO, holding 13% each. The International Civil Aviation Organisation (ICAO) has already given techno-feasibility clearance to the airport and the central cabinet has cleared it. The project is at global tendering stage.

Railway
Panvel railway station is one of the most important junctions on Central Railway. Harbour line from Mumbai CSMT, central line from Diva / Karjat, Western Dedicated Freight Corridor from JNPT and the line from Roha meet at Panvel. Panvel railway station comes under Mumbai division of Central Railway.
Panvel is one of the terminating stations of the harbour line of the Mumbai Suburban Railway. It is also considered as an entry point for trains bound for Konkan Railway from northern and western India. Platforms 1,2,3 & 4 are for suburban trains while platforms 5,6 & 7 are for main line trains. Nine pairs of daily express trains, 13 pairs of non-daily express trains and 12 daily commuter (passenger) trains stop here. Also, the Ernakulam – Hazrat Nizamuddin Duronto Express has a technical halt at Panvel for crew change, refueling and catering. In addition, Panvel handles 116 suburban trains which go to destinations Mumbai CSMT, Wadala Road, Goregaon and Thane. The station also handles a sizeable amount of freight trains. Panvel is considered equivalent to Mumbai for trains which skip Mumbai. The trains run on diesel traction and alternating current (the tracks to Konkan are not electrified south of Roha), and Panvel is a refueling point for their locomotives. In addition to refueling, Panvel has a huge number of parcel bookings, and most trains stop for periods varying from 5 minutes to 20 minutes for technical purposes. Panvel also handles crew and locomotive change for a few long-distance passenger / freight trains.

Diesel Locomotives has the facility to fill the Diesel. Good connectivity for Pune, Ahmedabad and Delhi on daily basis. Daily trains for Thiruvananthapuram, Kochi, Mangalore, Pune, Goa and Delhi along with Ahmedabad. Also there are trains for Patna, Bikaner, Chennai, Bhavnagar, Veraval, Vasco etc. Sampark Krantis and Rajdhanis
have halt here along with Garib Rath and Double Decker. Some of the daily trains are 12051/52 Jan Shatabdi Express (Dadar – Madgaon), Mandovi Express, Pragati Express, etc. Now all the local trains will be 12 Coach as now the current line is AC current. Indian Railways's Central Railway division conducted an inaugural run of an AC local train from Panvel to Thane on 30 January 2020 at 3:30 pm on an open path towards Thane. On its return journey, the train ran from Thane to Panvel on an open path. The AC Local started its regular commercial services from 31 January 2020. The AC local also starts from Nerul and Vashi to Thane. On the day of its inaugural run, many travellers boarded the train as they weren't aware that a separate ticket was needed to board the AC Local. The train was even made to halt at one station as one door got blocked and wasn't opening. This further delayed the train's as well as other trains' timings on the route. This all happened despite the train had security guards and ticket checkers. Following this incident, the number of security guards and ticket checkers was nearly doubled and awareness was being created amongst travellers.

Autorickshaws
There are many autorickshaws in Panvel. The minimum fare is Rs. 20 in share-autos, but Rs. 40 for sole-hire. This is high as compared to the Rs. 18 in other parts of Navi Mumbai, Mumbai & Thane. Even though there is now the cheaper CNG fuel, autos – because of political support – are not controlled by the RTO. There is no "Fare Chart" defined by RTO for Panvel, unlike other parts of Navi Mumbai. This needs to improve for the benefit of commuters.

Bus
There are two main bus stands in Panvel – ST stand on the National Highway and NMMT stand near Railway Station. The ST buses are available from Panvel to Karjat, Alibaug, Pen, Roha, Khopoli, Thane, Bhiwandi, Kalyan, Dombivli, Badlapur, Dadar, Uran as well as beyond Mumbai Metropolitan Region. NMMT buses are available from Panvel to Thane, Vashi, Dadar, World Trade Centre (Cuffe Parade) and inner areas of Panvel city. Panvel is the second busiest bus station in the state after Latur. It is the major bus station for the state as it a junction for Konkan and Pune routes buses. There is a heavy rush on Ganpati Festival, Diwali Festival and May vacations.

See also
Sainagar

References

External links
The Gazetters Department: Panvel

 
Cities and towns in Raigad district
Cities in Maharashtra
1852 establishments in India